Davide Viganò (born 12 June 1984 in Carate Brianza) is an Italian road bicycle racer, who most recently competed for Italian amateur team, .

Major results

2001
 3rd  Team pursuit, UEC European Junior Track Championships
2004
 3rd Trofeo Gianfranco Bianchin
 9th Gran Premio della Liberazione
2005
 3rd Criterium dei Campioni
2007
 1st Stage 1 (TTT) Tour of Qatar
 3rd Dutch Food Valley Classic
2008
 4th Gran Premio Bruno Beghelli
 5th Giro del Piemonte
 6th Profronde van Fryslan
2009
 6th Vattenfall Cyclassics
2011
 1st Stage 1 (TTT) Vuelta a España
 4th Binche–Tournai–Binche
2013
 1st  Mountains classification Tour of Japan
2014
 Volta a Portugal
1st  Points classification
1st Stage 2
 3rd Clásica de Almería
 4th Coppa Bernocchi
 5th Memorial Marco Pantani
 6th Gran Premio Industria e Commercio di Prato
 7th Coppa Sabatini
 9th Trofeo Palma
 10th Gran Premio Bruno Beghelli
2015
 1st  Overall Okolo Slovenska
1st  Points classification
1st Stage 3
 1st Stage 3 Volta a Portugal
 2nd Gran Premio della Costa Etruschi
 3rd Trofeo Matteotti
2016
 Sibiu Cycling Tour
1st  Points classification
1st Stage 4
 3rd Trofeo Matteotti
 6th Coppa Bernocchi

Grand Tour general classification results timeline

References

External links

1984 births
Living people
People from Carate Brianza
Italian male cyclists
Cyclists from the Province of Monza e Brianza